In Greek mythology, ichor is the ethereal fluid that is the blood of the gods and/or immortals. The Ancient Greek word  is of uncertain etymology, and has been suggested to be a foreign word.

In classical myth
Ichor originates in Greek mythology, where it is the ‘ethereal fluid’ that is the blood of the Greek gods, sometimes said to retain the qualities of the immortals’ food and drink, ambrosia and nectar. Ichor is described as toxic to humans, killing them instantly if they came in contact with it. Great heroes and demigods occasionally attacked gods and released ichor, but gods rarely did so to each other in Homeric myth.

 
  Blood follow'd, but immortal ichor pure,
 Such as the blest inhabitants of heav'n
 May bleed, nectareous; for the Gods eat not
 Man's food, nor slake as he with sable wine
 Their thirst, thence bloodless and from death exempt.

,  

In Ancient Crete, tradition told of Talos, a giant man of bronze. When Cretan mythology was appropriated by the Greeks, they imagined him more like the Colossus of Rhodes. He possessed a single vein running with ichor that was stoppered by a nail in his back. Talos guarded Europa on Crete and threw boulders at intruders, until the Argonauts came after the acquisition of the Golden Fleece, and the sorceress Medea took out the nail, releasing the ichor and killing him.
It [a magical herb] first appeared in a plant that sprang from the blood-like ichor of Prometheus in his torment, which the flesh-eating Eagle had dropped on the spurs of the Kaukasos.

Prometheus was a Titan, who made humans and stole fire from the gods and gave it to the mortals, and consequently was punished by Zeus for all eternity. Prometheus was chained to a rock for his liver eaten by an eagle. His liver would then regrow, just to be eaten again, repeated for all eternity. Prometheus bled ichor, a golden, blood-like substance that would cause a magical herb to sprout when it touched the ground.

In medicine
In pathology, "ichor" is an antiquated term for a watery discharge from a wound or ulcer, with an unpleasant or fetid (offensive) smell.

The Greek Christian writer Clement of Alexandria [deliberately] confounded ichor in its medical sense as a foul-smelling watery discharge from a wound or ulcer with its mythological sense as the blood of the gods, in a polemic against the pagan Greek gods. As part of his evidence that they are merely mortal, he cites several cases in which the gods are wounded physically, and then asserts that
 ... "if there are wounds, there is blood. For the ichor of the poets is more repulsive than blood; for the putrefaction of blood is called ichor."

See also
Blood of Christ
Ectoplasm (paranormal)
Petrichor

References

External links

Greek mythology
Mythological substances
Vitalism
Blood